The Brick Store Building is a historic commercial building located at Bridgewater in Oneida County, New York.

Description and history 
It was built in 1807, and consists of a two-story, gable-roofed, rectangular brick main block with a two-story, wood-framed rear wing in a vernacular Federal style. The entire building rests on a limestone foundation.

It was listed on the National Register of Historic Places on April 26, 1996.

References

Commercial buildings on the National Register of Historic Places in New York (state)
Federal architecture in New York (state)
Commercial buildings completed in 1807
Buildings and structures in Oneida County, New York
National Register of Historic Places in Oneida County, New York